Litang is in southwest of Garzê Tibetan Autonomous Prefecture, Sichuan, China.

Litang is part of Kham in the Tibetan cultural zone, and several famous Buddhist figures were born here, including the 7th Dalai Lama, the 10th Dalai Lama, the 11th Tai Situpa, four of the Pabalas, as well as the 5th Jamyang Zhépa of Labrang Monastery. Düsum Khyenpa, 1st Karmapa Lama, returned here and built Kampo Nénang Monastery and Pangphuk Monastery. It also has strong connections with the eponymous hero of the Epic of King Gesar.

History

In 1272, the Yuan Dynasty set up Litang Zhou, later set up Ben Buer Yi Si Gang to recruit envoys, and in 1288 set up the Qianliang Office. In the Ming Dynasty, Litang Xuanfu Division was set up, and later it was Zhawudong Sima Qianhu Office; in the late Ming and early Qing Dynasties, it was the territory of Gushi Khan. In 1709, the Qing Dynasty set up a deputy camp officer, belonging to the Qinghai Daiqingheshuoqi Department. In 1719, the Qing army passed through Litang, and all the chieftains submitted their household registration to pay grain, and Litang was placed under Sichuan Province. In 1729, Litang was established as the deputy Xuanfu Division, which belongs to the Arrow Furnace Hall. in 1792, the grain affairs committee was established. In 1876, the land was reformed, and Lihua County was established, and in 1906, Hue County was established. In 1908, the Lihua Hall was set up to govern Daaba (Daocheng), Dingxiang (township), Shunhua (Litang) and other counties. In 1911, it was upgraded to Baohuafu. In 1913, the government of the Republic of China established Lihua County, which was subordinate to the Chuanbian Special Administrative Region. In 1925, it was changed to Xikang Road, Xikang Province. On December 14, 1951, it was renamed Litang County.

Geography and Climate

Litang County is located in the west of Sichuan Province, the southwest of Garze Tibetan Autonomous Prefecture, between the Jinsha River and the Yalong River on the southeastern edge of the Qinghai-Tibet Plateau. The Shaluli Mountain in the middle section of the Hengduan Mountains runs from north to south. The terrain is dominated by hill-shaped plateaus and mountain plains. The main mountain ranges are Genie Mountain with an altitude of 6,204 meters, Xiaozha Mountain with an altitude of 5,807 meters, Kemailong Mountain with an altitude of 5,780 meters and Kuergang Zhongshan with an altitude of 5,601 meters. The rivers in Litang County are divided into two major river systems, the Yalong River and the Jinsha River. There are 48 rivers with a drainage area of more than 100 square kilometers. Among them, 8 rivers including Wuliang River and Reyi River flow into the Yalong River, Naqu River and Lapo River. , Zhangna River three rivers into the Jinsha River. Litang Town (the seat of the county) itself is located at an altitude of 4,014 metres. It is on open grassland and surrounded by snow-capped mountains and is about 400 meters higher than Lhasa, making it one of the highest towns in the world.

Litang County has Haizi Mountain National Nature Reserve, Gemu County Nature Reserve, Xiaba Zhaga Sacred Mountain Nature Reserve, Wulianghe Provincial Wetland Park, and Zaraoxi Scenic Area. The ecological protection red line area is 7510.94 square kilometers, accounting for 52.33% of the county's total area and 10.77% of the state's ecological red line area. There are China's national second-class protected vegetable oil barley spruce and long-bud fir, and China's first-class protected animals include white-lipped deer, forest musk deer, horse musk deer, leopard, snow leopard, Chinese merganser duck, golden eagle, jade belt sea eagle, bearded vulture, bar-tailed Hazel Chicken, Sichuan Pheasant. China's second-class protected animals include macaques, Asian black bears, otters, lynx, golden cats, sambar, Tibetan gazelle, goral, blue sheep, argali, grassland eagle, and Tibetan horse chicken.

The soils in Litang County are mainly alpine meadow soil, dark brown soil and alpine shrub meadow soil. There are 9 types and 13 sub-types. The forest area is 18,375.73 hectares, the county's forest coverage rate is 7.4%, the standing wood volume is 51,391,343 cubic meters, the main tree species are fir and spruce, the total area of ​​natural grassland is 12,357,700 mu, the usable area is 9,891,600 mu, and the main forage species are There are alpine pine grass, Sichuan pine grass, black flower moss grass and so on. The climate of Litang County belongs to the plateau climate zone, with long dry and cold winters and short warm seasons. The average temperature is 3.0 °C, the extreme maximum temperature is 25.6 °C, the minimum temperature is -30.6 °C, the annual rainfall is 722.2 mm, the frost-free period is only 50 days, and the annual average The sunshine hours are 2637.7 hours, and the annual solar radiation amount reaches 159.4 kcal/square centimeter.

Administrative divisions
Litang County administers one town and 23 more rural townships:
Urban Town:Litang Town
Townships:Junba Township, Hayi Township, Juewu Township, Moba Township, Yahuo Township, Rongba Township, Gake Township, Benge Township, Cunge Township, Heni Township, Qudeng Township, Lamaya Township, Zhangna Township, Shangmula Township, Xiamula Township, Zhongmula Township, Zhuosang Township, Jiawa Township, Cangba Township, Gemu Township, Labo Township, Maiwa Township, Dewu Township

Social
According to China's seventh national census in 2020, Litang County has a total population of 67,293 people, of which 51.56% are male and 48.44% are female, with a sex ratio of 106.42. 27.8% were aged 0–14, 63.44% were aged 14–59, 8.76% were aged over 60, and 6.18% were aged over 65. University education accounted for 8.603%, high school education accounted for 4.714%, junior high school education accounted for 10.05%, and primary school education accounted for 38.335% .

In 2021, the resident population of Litang County is 74,740, of which the registered population is 68,202. The urbanization rate is 39.19%. Most of them are Tibetans, and there are Han, Mongolian, Hui, Naxi, Tujia, Yi, Miao and Qiang nationalities , Litang people traditionally live on herding, and the tourism industry has gradually developed since the reform and opening up.

In 2020, the GDP of Litang County will reach 1.96275 billion yuan, the industrial added value will be 137.57 million yuan, the total investment in fixed assets of the whole society will be 1.21468 billion yuan, the total retail sales of consumer goods will be 843.62 million yuan, and the per capita disposable income of urban residents will be 39,343 yuan. , the per capita disposable income of rural residents is 13,009 yuan. On February 18, 2020, the Sichuan Provincial Government approved the withdrawal of Litang County from poverty-stricken counties.

Transport
China National Highway 318

Notes

External links
Official website of Litang County

Populated places in the Garzê Tibetan Autonomous Prefecture
County-level divisions of Sichuan
Tibetan Buddhist places

pl:Litang